Anduril may refer to:

 Andúril, a fictional sword in J. R. R. Tolkien's Middle-earth fantasy writings, originally known as Narsil
 Anduril (workflow engine), an open-source workflow framework
 Anduril Industries, a defense technology company co-founded in 2017 by entrepreneur Palmer Luckey